The  is a judo kata that, like the Gonosen-no-kata, focuses on counter-attacks to throwing techniques. It was developed by Mifune Kyūzō, and is not an officially recognized Kodokan kata.

Techniques
 Uki otoshi countered by Tai otoshi
 Seoinage countered by Yoko guruma
 Kata guruma countered by Sumi gaeshi
 Tai otoshi countered by Kotsuri goshi
 Obi otoshi countered by O guruma
 Okuriashi harai countered by Tsubame gaeshi
 Kouchi gari countered by Hiza Guruma
 Ouchi gari countered by Ouchi gaeshi
 Sasae tsurikomi ashi countered by Sumi otoshi
 Uchi mata countered by Tai otoshi
 Hane goshi countered by Kari gaeshi
 Harai goshi countered by Ushiro goshi
 Hane goshi countered by Utsuri goshi
 Uki goshi countered by Yoko wakare
 O goshi countered by Ippon seoinage

In a video-taped version performed by Mifune dating from the 1950s, Ouchi gari gaeshi, the counter for Ouchi gari, is replaced with Tomoe nage.  Although the video notes that Mifune will counter the Uchi-mata with a Tai otoshi, Mifune actually counters the Uchi mata with an O guruma.

External links 

 Video of the Nage-waza ura-no-kata. Tori is Mifune Kyūzō.

References

Judo kata